Nicole Jordan is an American beauty pageant competitor from Cordova, Tennessee. on June 19, 2010, she won the title of Miss Tennessee, singing "All by Myself" and succeeding Stefanie Wittler.

Jordan, who has performed since the age of 7, has won numerous awards for her singing. She graduated from the University of Alabama, where she majored in musical theatre and was a member of the Tri-Delta sorority.

Jordan became a client of the Block Agency, a modeling agency in Nashville, Tennessee. She married country music singer Brandon Lay. She owns a medical and surgical supply company.

References

External links

 
 

Living people
American beauty pageant winners
Miss America 2011 delegates
Miss Tennessee winners
People from Cordova, Tennessee
University of Alabama alumni
1989 births